Metathrinca loranthivora is a moth in the family Xyloryctidae. It was described by Edward Meyrick in 1937. It is found on Java in Indonesia.

The larvae have been recorded feeding in the shoots of Loranthus species.

References

Metathrinca
Moths described in 1937